Joseph Raoul Hurtubise (July 1, 1882 – January 31, 1955) was a Canadian politician. He represented the riding of Nipissing in the House of Commons of Canada from 1930 to 1945. He was a member of the Liberal Party.

Before entering politics, Hurtubise was a surgeon.

He left electoral politics in 1945, when he was appointed to the Senate. He sat as a senator until his death in 1955.

References
 

1882 births
1955 deaths
Canadian senators from Ontario
Franco-Ontarian people
Liberal Party of Canada MPs
Liberal Party of Canada senators
Members of the House of Commons of Canada from Ontario